Voldemar Noormägi (10 August 1895 – 10 April 1967) was an Estonian lightweight weightlifter who won a bronze medal at the 1922 World Championships and placed 22nd at the 1924 Summer Olympics. In 1923–24, he set three unofficial world records in snatch.

Noormägi was born deaf and was inspired to begin weightlifting in 1909, when an Estonian professional wrestler and weightlifter Georg Lurich visited his school. Noormägi won the national lightweight title in 1923 and 1927, but at the 1924 World Championships, he injured his hand and failed to finish. While working as a photographer in Tallinn and Narva he became strongly religious and lost interest in sport, as he came to believe that sport is a sin.

References

1895 births
1968 deaths
People from Kingisepp
People from Yamburgsky Uyezd
Olympic weightlifters of Estonia
Weightlifters at the 1924 Summer Olympics
Estonian male weightlifters
People associated with physical culture
World Weightlifting Championships medalists
20th-century Estonian people
Estonian deaf people